Gareth John Griffiths (born 10 April 1970) is an English former footballer. A defender, he played 337 league games in a 13-year career in the English Football League.

Starting his career with Welsh club Rhyl, he made the move to the English professional game in 1993 with Port Vale. After around 100 games in five years for the club he transferred to Wigan Athletic in 1998. In another three years he moved on to Rochdale. A constant first team player at 'Dale, he made 184 league appearances in five years with the club. In 2006, he joined non-league Northwich Victoria, where he spent one season before retiring.

Career
Griffiths started his career with Rhyl, before being bought by John Rudge, manager of Second Division club Port Vale, for £1,000 in February 1993. He made his debut in a 1–1 draw with Stockport County on 12 February 1994, though played little part in the 1993–94 promotion campaign, though found himself regularly appearing in the First Division from August 1994. In November 1994 he developed a groin injury which required him to go in for a double hernia operation in January 1995, but by the end of the season had regained his first team place. A regular member of the "Valiants" first team in 1995–96, he played in the 1996 Anglo-Italian Cup Final, as Vale lost 5–2 to Genoa. He made 31 appearances in 1996–97, as the club made its joint-second highest ever league finish. He spent November 1997 on loan at Shrewsbury Town, and made six Third Division appearances for Jake King's "Shrews", before returning to Vale Park. He played three games for Vale in 1997–98, and was given a free transfer in the summer.

He signed with Wigan Athletic in June 1998. He played 26 times for the "Latics" in 1998–99, though did not feature in the play-off semi-final defeat to Manchester City. The club switched stadiums in the summer, moving from Springfield Park to the JJB Stadium, and also switched managers, replacing John Deehan with Ray Mathias. Griffiths played 20 times in 1999–2000, and was an unused substitute in the play-off Final defeat to Gillingham. He made 22 appearances in 2000–01 for manager Bruce Rioch, but did not feature under Steve Bruce.

He joined Rochdale in July 2001. Scoring four goals in 48 appearances in 2001–02, he helped "Dale" reach the Third Division play-off semi-finals, where they were beaten by Rushden & Diamonds. Manager Steve Parkin left Spotland in November 2001, and the club tried John Hollins, Paul Simpson and Alan Buckley in the role, before Parkin returned in December 2003. In his absence, Griffiths scored seven goals in 47 games in 2002–03, helping the club to avoid finishing at the foot of the table. He then made 35 appearances in 2003–04, as Rochdale avoided slipping out of the league by two places and five points. The defender scored four goals in 43 games in 2004–05, including a surprise hat-trick against Scarborough in a 4–1 win in the Football League Trophy on 28 September. He played 29 games in League Two in 2005–06, before announcing his retirement from professional football in May 2006. He then moved out of the Football League and joined Steve Burr's Northwich Victoria in July 2006, and played 27 Conference National games before leaving at the end of the 2006–07 season.

Post-retirement
For the last four years of his playing career he served on the Management Committee of the Professional Footballers' Association, reporting directly to chief executive Gordon Taylor and other senior members of the management board. Whilst playing he obtained a first class honours degree, a post-graduate marketing certificate, and qualified as a financial consultant.

Following his retirement from football he began working in the financial services industry. He became a trustee at the PFA, and co founded Pro Sport Wealth Management LLP, a Chartered firm of Independent Financial Advisers who specialise in bespoke planning for both individual and corporate sports professionals.

Career statistics
Source:

Honours
Port Vale
Football League Second Division second-place promotion: 1993–94
Anglo-Italian Cup runner-up: 1996

References

1970 births
Living people
People from Winsford
Sportspeople from Cheshire
English footballers
Association football defenders
Rhyl F.C. players
Port Vale F.C. players
Shrewsbury Town F.C. players
Wigan Athletic F.C. players
Rochdale A.F.C. players
Northwich Victoria F.C. players
English Football League players
National League (English football) players
English financial businesspeople
Financial advisors